WWF Panda Junior is a 2004 educational adventure game developed by Neko Entertainment SARL and published by SG Diffusion for Windows. It was the first and only entry in the Safari Adventure game series, which were inspired by the work of the World Wild Fund for Nature (WWF), with between 50 cents and $1 from the purchase price donated to WWF.

Gameplay and plot 
Players take the role of either Alex or Emma as they discover the African continent with the aid of a WWF panda and a forest ranger.

Critical reception 
Jeux Video was disappointed that the gameplay was a bit repetitive and that the game was too short. Meanwhile, Meristation felt it was "near perfect". Absolute Games thought the title mostly achieved its aim of unobtrusive acquaintance of children with the environment.

References

External links 
 Mobygames
 Homepage

2004 video games
Adventure games
Neko Entertainment games
Children's educational video games
Environmental education video games
Video games about bears
Video games developed in France
Windows games
Windows-only games